Pentalepis trichodesmoides is a species of flowering plant endemic to Australia, and found in the Northern Territory and  Western Australia.

It was first described by Ferdinand von Mueller in 1863. The species epithet, trichodesmoides, refers to the likeness of this plant to Trichodesma zeylanicum at the beginning of flowering.

References

External links
Pentalepis trichodesmoides occurrence data from the Australasian Virtual Herbarium

Heliantheae
Flora of Western Australia
Flora of the Northern Territory